The 2014 Maryland Terrapins men's soccer team was the college's 69th season of playing organized men's college soccer, and the school's first in the Big Ten Conference.

Background 
Prior to the 2014 season, the Big Ten Conference added two new members, the University of Maryland and Rutgers University, as a part of a major conference realignment. In the 2013 season, Maryland made it all the way to the College Cup final, losing to Notre Dame.

Roster

Competitions

Preseason exhibitions

Regular season

Big Ten Standings

Match results

Big Ten Tournament

NCAA Tournament

Statistics

Transfers

Out

See also 
2014 Big Ten Conference men's soccer season
2014 Big Ten Conference Men's Soccer Tournament
2014 NCAA Division I Men's Soccer Championship

References 

Maryland Terrapins
Maryland Terrapins men's soccer seasons
Maryland Terrapins
Maryland Terrapins
Maryland Terrapins
Big Ten Conference men's soccer champion seasons